is a Japanese light novel series written by Himawari. Originally posted to the Shōsetsuka ni Narō novel posting website in November 2012, the series was later acquired by Futabasha, who began publishing the series with illustrations by Kiouran in July 2016 under their M Novels f imprint. As of January 2023, 14 volumes have been released. A manga adaptation with illustrations by Yuriko Takagami began serialization on Futabasha's Gaugau Monster manga website in November 2017.  As of October 2022, the series' individual chapters have been collected into ten volumes. An anime television series adaptation is set to premiere in 2023.

Media

Light novel
The light novel began publication online on the novel posting website Shōsetsuka ni Narō on November 5, 2012. The series was later acquired by Futabasha, who began publishing the series with illustrations by Kiouran on July 15, 2016 under their M Novels f imprint. As of January 2023, 14 volumes have been released.

Volume list

Manga
A manga adaptation with illustrations by Yuriko Takagami began serialization on Futabasha's Gaugau Monster manga website on November 6, 2017. As of October 2022, the series' individual chapters have been collected into ten tankōbon volumes.

Coolmic is publishing the manga in English under the title Fluffy Paradise.

Volume list

Anime
An anime adaptation was announced on July 9, 2022. It was later revealed to be a television series that is set to premiere in 2023.

Reception
The light novels and manga combined have 1.6 million copies in circulation.

References

External links
 Official website at Shōsetsuka ni Narō 
 Official anime website 
 

2016 Japanese novels
2023 anime television series debuts
Anime and manga based on light novels
Fiction about reincarnation
Futabasha manga
Isekai anime and manga
Isekai novels and light novels
Japanese webcomics
Light novels
Light novels first published online
Seinen manga
Shōsetsuka ni Narō
Upcoming anime television series
Webcomics in print